Beharia is a village in Suri II Block of the Birbhum district in West Bengal. It is administered by Purandarpur gram panchayat.  The total area of the village is 221.2 hectares.

Demographics 
The Beharia village has a population of 707 of which 360 are males while 347 are females as per Population Census 2011. Male literacy rate of  Beharia village is 81.53% and female literacy rate is 65.42% averaging 73.73% literacy rate.

Education 
There is a government owned primary school Kalitala Behira Primary School.

Culture

There is a temple named Behira Nimbo-basini Kalitala Mondir.

References

External links

Villages in Birbhum district